Ta Kao is a capital tambon (subdistrict) of Nam Khun district, in Ubon Ratchathani Province, Thailand. It previously was a tambon in Nam Yuen district but gained district status in 1996.

As of the 2021 consensus, it had a population of 10,056 people and 3,867 households in 14 villages (Muban;  บ้าน or หมู่บ้าน), which were further subdivided into 15 administrative community groups (Moo or Mu; หมู่). Neighbouring subdistricts are (clockwise from the south) Song, Khok Sa-at, Phaibun, Khilek, Yang, and Kao Kham.

History
The village of Ta Kao was founded in the early 19th century by a group of Khmer-origin settlers led by an elderly Kao (or Ta Kao); the village was then named Ta Kao in honor of the first village headman. At the early age, tambon Ta Kao was administrated from Thailand's former province,  then was transferred to Det Udom district in 1912.

In 1974, Tambon Ta Kao, together with three other tambons, including Song, Dom Pradit, and Yang, were split off from Det Udom to create a province's new administrative division, Nam Yuen district; the preparation for such an upgrade began in 1969 with the formation of King amphoe (small district) Nam Yuen. 

In 1977, Takao's northern half, which consisted of 11 villages, was split off to form a new tambon called Khilek; a newly established tambon was later split off to create tambon Phaibun in  1982. Its southwest territory was also promoted to tambon Khok Sa-at in 1991. Later in 1996, Ta Kao and its all three mentioned descendant tambons were cut off from Nam Yuen district to creat a province's new district, Nam Khun.

After independence, Tambon Ta Kao was governed by the Subdistrict Council of Ta Kao, which was upgraded to the Subdistrict Administrative Organization (SAO) in 1997, and, effective on December 13, 2013, it was later promoted to a subdistrict municipality.

Geography
The tambon covers 78 km2 and is located in the eastern region of the Nam Khun district, on Lam Som River's basin (ลำซอม), one of the tributaries of the Lam Dom Yai River (ลำโดมใหญ่).

Administration
The subdistrict of Ta Kao is subdivided into 14 villages (mubans; หมู่บ้าน) and is further subdivided into 15 administrative community groups (Moo or Mu; หมู่). As of the 2021 census, it had a population of 10,056 people with 3,867 households.

The entire tambon is governed by the Ta Kao Subdistrict Municipality (เทศบาลตำบลตาเกา).

The following is a list of the subdistrict's mubans, which roughly correspond to the villages.

References

Tambon of Ubon Ratchathani Province